Sergio Tejera Rodríguez (born 28 May 1990) is a Spanish professional footballer who plays for Cypriot First Division club Anorthosis Famagusta F.C. as a central midfielder.

Club career
Born  in Barcelona, Catalonia, Tejera joined local RCD Espanyol's youth ranks in 2000, aged 10. Six years later, he was spotted by Chelsea scout Frank Arnesen during a match with the Spain under-15s, joining the London club in late March. During his spell with the Blues, he appeared in 22 games for the reserves and scored once.

In the last days of the 2009 January transfer window, Chelsea agreed to loan Tejera to RCD Mallorca in his country. On 24 July, the Balearic Islands side exercised their buying option on the player and signed him to a four-year contract.

Tejera spent the vast majority of his first seasons with Mallorca with the B team in the Segunda División B. On 7 November 2010, he made his first-team – and La Liga – debut, playing 11 minutes in a 3–2 away loss against Real Zaragoza.

In the summer of 2012, Tejera returned to Espanyol as Javi Márquez moved in the opposite direction. He scored his first goal in the top flight on 2 September, his team's second in a 3–2 defeat at Levante UD.

On 29 January 2014, after receiving no playing time during the campaign, Tejera was loaned to Deportivo Alavés until June. On 4 August, the move was extended for one year.

Tejera terminated his contract with Espanyol on 8 July 2015, and moved to neighbouring Gimnàstic de Tarragona hours later. On 11 June 2018, he signed a two-year deal with Segunda División club Real Oviedo.

On 2 July 2021, free agent Tejera agreed to a two-year contract with FC Cartagena, still in the second tier. He moved abroad again in January 2023, joining Anorthosis Famagusta F.C. of the Cypriot First Division until June 2024.

Honours
Spain U17
FIFA U-17 World Cup runner-up: 2007

References

External links

1990 births
Living people
Spanish footballers
Footballers from Barcelona
Association football midfielders
La Liga players
Segunda División players
Segunda División B players
Tercera División players
CF Damm players
RCD Mallorca B players
RCD Mallorca players
RCD Espanyol footballers
Deportivo Alavés players
Gimnàstic de Tarragona footballers
Real Oviedo players
FC Cartagena footballers
Chelsea F.C. players
Cypriot First Division players
Anorthosis Famagusta F.C. players
Spain youth international footballers
Catalonia international footballers
Spanish expatriate footballers
Expatriate footballers in England
Expatriate footballers in Cyprus
Spanish expatriate sportspeople in England
Spanish expatriate sportspeople in Cyprus